The 2023 Asian Tour is the 28th season of the modern Asian Tour, the main men's professional golf tour in Asia excluding Japan, since it was established in 1995.

The season marked a switch of format in the Order of Merit, which seen it become a points-based system, rather than based on money earned.

Schedule
The following table lists official events during the 2023 season.

Notes

References

External links
The Asian Tour's official site

Asian Tour
Asian Tour
Tour
Asian Tour